Eastern Low Prussian is a subdialect of Low Prussian that was spoken around Angerburg (now Węgorzewo, Poland), Insterburg (Chernyakhovsk, Russia), Memelland (Klaipėda County, Lithuania), and Tilsit (Sovetsk, Kaliningrad Oblast, Russia) in the eastern territories of East Prussia in the former eastern territories of Germany. Many speakers of this subdialect were Prussian Lithuanians.

Geography 
Eastern Low Prussian had borders with Ostsamländisch, Natangian, and Standard German. Lithuanian language was spoken within its area.

Phonology 
In difference to varieties to the West, it had no vocalization of /r/. Its alveolar /r/ probably counts among its influences from Lithuanian. Werdersch has an alveolar as well.

Eastern Low Prussian has a greater phonetic affinity to Standard German than Samlandic. The /ai/ of Samlandic is given as /ei/ with long /e/.

It has features common with Nehrungisch. It has major High German influence, a Lithuanian substrate, even numerous words having undergone High German consonant shift. High German influence is, though not exclusively, by Salzburg Protestants.

It has dorx for High German durch, English through.

Grammar 
There was a diminutive ending -l around Gusev, Kaliningrad Oblast (Gumbinnen), explained by Upper German influence.

References

Bibliography

External Link 
Bible excerpt in Eastern Low Prussian

Low Prussian dialect
German dialects
Languages of Lithuania
Languages of Russia